Gholamreza Mesbahi-Moghaddam (born 11 July 1951 in Mashhad, Iran) is an Iranian conservative politician and the former representative of Tehran in the Iranian parliament. He is currently a member of the Expediency Discernment Council and also a member of Assembly of Experts.

References

External links

1951 births
Living people
Deputies of Tehran, Rey, Shemiranat and Eslamshahr
Combatant Clergy Association politicians
Members of the 7th Islamic Consultative Assembly
Members of the 8th Islamic Consultative Assembly
Members of the 9th Islamic Consultative Assembly
Alliance of Builders of Islamic Iran politicians